Otnurok is a rural locality (a village) in Nursky Selsoviet, Beloretsky District, Bashkortostan, Russia. The population was 5 as of 2010. There are 11 streets.

Geography 
Otnurok is located 17 km northwest of Beloretsk (the district's administrative centre) by road. Otnurok (selo) is the nearest rural locality.

References 

Rural localities in Beloretsky District